Bhoot Chaturdashi is a 2019 Indian Bengali-language adventure horror film directed by Shabbir Mallick. This film was released on May 17, 2019, under the banner of Shree Venkatesh Films.

Synopsis
The film starts while Shreya drawis a figure of a girl's face vigorously on the walls of a mental asylum. She has drawn the same picture over all the walls. The story then goes to flashback.
 
Rano is an aspiring filmmaker who wants to make a documentary on 'Lakshmi's Bari' , a supposedly haunted place situated on the banks of Ajay river on the outskirts of Bolpur. Rano and his girlfriend Shreya and Shreya's friend Pritha and her boyfriend Debu travel to the place on the evening prior to bhoot chaturdashi.
 
After reaching Bolpur, they gather information about the place. It is then revealed that Lakshmi is the illegal child of the Tagore family, and she was raised at a palace made for her. People believed that she might be a witch and hence, she was sacrificed to Goddess Chamunda by burning her alive, but while burning she ran away and was never found. Rano and his team were warned to not go into that house which is believed to be haunted.
 
After reaching that place, Rano started exploring the house with a camera, while Pritha and Debu, in spite of having no interest in going there, started exploring. Meanwhile, Shreya found an anklet while Rano found a skeleton, implying that the ritual of sacrifice might survive. While they are busy shooting and exploring, a child runs around whom they didn't notice. 
 
After they finish shooting they reach a river bank. Rano and the others are relaxing there when they encounter a gathering of villagers and tantriks where a cremation is taking place. They learn that that day is bhoot chaturdashi, when this type of thing occurs. While they head back they find a strange looking idol in the middle of the road that appears again during their journey. At that point they realize that something sinister is there so they want out. After driving without having a proper way out, they somehow reach Lakshmi's bari. This time they hear a child's laughter. While Shreya tells them that Lakshmi might want to say something, Debu becomes frightened when a chunk of cement falls near him. He wants to get away. They flee in spite of Shreya's unwillingness. Their car runs out of fuel and Debu blame Rano for everything. After a heated argument, an upset Rano pushes Debu, who, in a fit of rage, wants to beat Rono but is taken away by an unseen force. They all run but somehow end up at Lakshmi's bari, with no exit. Meanwhile, Pritha, now possessed, falls into the well and dies. Suddenly, the premises light up with candles to reveal a group of people with tantriks, gathering to perform a sacrifice. Suddenly Shreya figures out that Rano is missing and, after hearing his scream, she realizes that he is kept in a 'harikatha' and was beheaded by a tantrik. On the outskirts of town, villagers who are actively taking part in the ritual arevealed to have been possessed or dead.
 
In the present, Shreya is drawing Lakshmi's picture all over the walls and repeatedly saying that if Lakshmi wants to play with you, you must play with her. It is then revealed that she is possessed by the ghost of Lakshmi.
 
In the final scene, Lakshmi in her deathbed attire, sitting in her palace presents an eerie smile on her burned face and the credits roll.

Cast
 Aryann Bhowmik as Rono
 Ena Saha as Shreya
 Soumendra Bhattacharya as Debu
 Deepsheta Mitra as Pritha

Soundtrack 
The music was composed by Indraadip Dasgupta, and features the song "Bhoy Korche" with lyrics by Ritam Sen and performed by Armeen Musa.

References

External links
 
Bengali-language Indian films
2010s Bengali-language films
2010s adventure films
Indian adventure films
Indian horror films
2019 horror films
2019 films
Adventure horror films